Indonesia Education League (in Indonesian : Liga Pendidikan Indonesia) is a football competition between junior and senior high schools and universities all over Indonesia. It is organized in stages, from the regency / city, provincial, regional, and national levels. Implementation of activities outside school hours or on school holidays on major educational element. Organized by the principle of the sports industry. Cooperation of the Ministry of National Education and Ministry of Youth and Sports and the Football Association of Indonesia. The President Cup tournament is gaining.

Players rules

Is a registered student or students who are actively studying in high school / University and has an average rating of academic seven for students in high school and college students who have a cumulative IP of 2.5. For players from junior high and equivalent levels should be a maximum of 15 years old, for players from high school and should equal a maximum of 18 years old and for players from the university should be a maximum of 23 years old. Players who are registered, are required to have a Community Card Indonesia Education League.

Championship history

Awards

Top scorers

Fair Play Awards

References

External links
Official site

Education